"Slash 'n' Burn" is a song by Welsh alternative rock band Manic Street Preachers. It was released on 16 March 1992 by record label Columbia as the fourth single from the band's debut album, Generation Terrorists (1992).

Content

Musical style 
The band has described the track as "the Stones playing metal", and features guitar riffs influenced by Michael Schenker and Slash of Guns N' Roses.

Emily Mackay of British cultural publication The Quietus proclaimed "Slash 'n' Burn" to be "cock-of-the-walk hair metal guitar strutting".

SputnikMusic adjudged the song "4 minutes of macho metal led by a joyously electric riff", in which "Bradfield takes perfect command of Wire and Edwards’ words".

Themes 
The song's title takes its inspiration from U.S. Army policy during the Vietnam War.

Release 
The single was released on 16 March 1992 by record label Columbia. It reached number 20 in the UK Singles Chart on 28 March 1992. B-sides "Motown Junk" and "Sorrow 16" were previously available on the "Motown Junk" single, released by the band's previous label.

Track listings 
CD

12-inch

7-inch

Charts

References

Sources

External links 
 

Manic Street Preachers songs
1992 singles
1992 songs
British heavy metal songs
Columbia Records singles
Songs written by James Dean Bradfield
Songs written by Nicky Wire
Songs written by Richey Edwards
Songs written by Sean Moore (musician)